Alpine Skiing at the 1994 Winter Olympics consisted of ten alpine skiing events, held north of the host city of Lillehammer, Norway. The speed events were held at Kvitfjell and the technical events at Hafjell from 13 to 21 February.

Medal summary
Ten nations won medals in alpine skiing, with Germany leading the medal table with three golds and one silver. The host team of Norway won the most medals with five (1 gold, 2 silver, 2 bronze). Markus Wasmeier of Germany led the individual medal table with two gold medals (super G and giant slalom), while Vreni Schneider of Switzerland won the most medals with three, one of each type. Tommy Moe of the United States won gold in the downhill and silver in the super G.
Kjetil André Aamodt of Norway won two silvers and a bronze.

Svetlana Gladishiva's silver medal was the first in alpine skiing won by Russia (Yevgeniya Sidorova won a bronze medal for the Soviet Union in 1956). Slovenia's three medals were the first for the country at the Winter Olympics.

Medal table

Source:

Men's events

Source:

Women's events

Source:

Course information

Source:

Participating nations
Forty-six nations sent alpine skiers to compete in the events in Lillehammer. Bosnia & Herzegovina, Georgia, Kazakhstan, Russia, Slovakia, and Ukraine made their Olympic alpine skiing debuts. Below is a list of the competing nations; in parentheses are the number of national competitors.

See also
Alpine skiing at the 1994 Winter Paralympics

References

External links
FIS-Ski.com – alpine skiing – 1994 Winter Olympics – Lillehammer, Norway

 
1994 Winter Olympics events
Alpine skiing at the Winter Olympics
Winter Olympics
Alpine skiing competitions in Norway